The Sisters of St Joseph of the Sacred Heart, often called the Josephites or Brown Joeys, are a Catholic religious order founded by Saint Mary MacKillop (1842–1909). Members of the congregation use the postnominal initials RSJ (Religious Sisters of St Joseph).

The order was founded in Penola, South Australia, in 1866 by Mary MacKillop and the Rev. Julian Tenison Woods.

The centre of the congregation is at Mary MacKillop Place, Mount Street, North Sydney, New South Wales, where Saint Mary MacKillop's tomb is enshrined in the Mary MacKillop Memorial Chapel.

At present there are around 850 sisters living and working throughout Australia (in all states except Tasmania) and New Zealand], as well as in Ireland and Peru. The current congregational leader of the Josephites is Sr Monica Cavanagh.

Besides the main centre at North Sydney, the Josephites, who were named after Saint Joseph, have "Mary MacKillop Centres" at Penola, South Australia; the Adelaide suburb of Kensington, South Australia; East Melbourne, Victoria; Annerley, Queensland; and South Perth, Western Australia. The Australian-New Zealand Federation of the Sisters of St Joseph includes congregations in Perthville and Lochinvar in New South Wales.

History

1866: founding

Fr Julian Tenison Woods had been very concerned about the lack of education, particularly Catholic education, in South Australia. In 1866, he invited MacKillop and her sisters Annie and Lexie to come to Penola and open a Catholic school. Woods was appointed director of education and became the founder, along with MacKillop, of a school they opened in a stable there. After renovations by their brother, the MacKillops started teaching more than 50 children. At this time MacKillop made a declaration of her dedication to God and began wearing black.

In 1867 MacKillop became the first member and superior general of the newly formed religious congregation of the Sisters of St Joseph of the Sacred Heart, and moved to a new convent in Grote Street, Adelaide. In the same year, at age 25, she adopted the religious name "Sister Mary of the Cross". In Adelaide they founded a new school at the request of the bishop, Laurence Bonaventure Sheil, OFM. Dedicated to the education of the children of the poor, it was the first religious institute to be founded by an Australian. The Rule of Life developed by Woods and MacKillop for the convent emphasised poverty, a dependence on divine providence, no ownership of personal belongings and faith that God would provide, and willingness to go where needed. The Rule were approved by Sheil. Near the end of 1867, ten other women had joined the Josephites, who had adopted a plain brown religious habit. In consequence, the Josephite sisters became colloquially known as the "Brown Joeys".

1866–1880s: expansion

In an attempt to provide education to all the poor, particularly in country areas, a school was opened at Yankalilla, South Australia, in October 1867. By the end of 1869, more than 70 Josephite sisters were educating children at 21 schools in Adelaide and the country. MacKillop and her Josephites were also involved with an orphanage; neglected children; girls in danger; the aged poor; a reformatory (in St Johns near Kapunda); a home for the aged; and the incurably ill.

In December 1869, MacKillop and several other sisters travelled to Brisbane to establish the congregation in Queensland. They were based at Kangaroo Point and took the ferry or rowed across the Brisbane River to attend Mass at old St Stephen's Cathedral. Two years later she was in Port Augusta, South Australia, for the same purpose. The Josephite congregation expanded rapidly and, by 1871, 130 sisters were working in more than 40 schools and charitable institutions across South Australia and Queensland.

After the acquisition of the Mother House at Kensington in 1872, MacKillop made preparations to leave for Rome to have the Rule of the Sisters of St Joseph approved by the Holy See. She travelled to Rome in 1873 and was encouraged in her work by Pope Pius IX. The authorities in Rome made changes to the way Josephites lived in poverty, declared that the Superior General and her Council were the authorities in charge of the institute, and assured MacKillop that the congregation and their Rule of Life would receive final approval after a trial period. The resulting softening of the Rule caused a breach between MacKillop and Woods, who felt that the revised Rule compromised the ideal of vowed poverty and blamed MacKillop for not getting the Rule accepted in its original form. Before Woods' death on 7 October 1889, he and MacKillop were personally reconciled, but he did not renew his involvement with the congregation. The sisters split, with Woods' branch becoming known as the "Black Josephites", for their black habits, while MacKillop's sisters donned brown habits and were thus known as the "Brown Josephites".

While in Europe, MacKillop travelled widely to observe educational methods.

During this period, the Josephites expanded their operations into New South Wales and New Zealand. MacKillop relocated to Sydney in 1883 on the instruction of Bishop Reynolds of Adelaide. When she returned in January 1875, after an absence of nearly two years, she brought approval from Rome for her sisters and the work they did, materials for her school, books for the convent library, several priests, and most of all 15 new Josephites from Ireland. Regardless of her success, she still had to contend with the opposition of priests and several bishops. This did not change after her unanimous election as superior general in March 1875.

The Josephites were unique among Catholic church ministries in two ways. Firstly, the sisters lived in the community rather than in convents. Secondly, the congregation's constitution required administration by a superior general rather than being subject to the local bishop, a situation unique in its day. This structure resulted in the institute being forced to leave Bathurst in 1876 and Queensland by 1880 due to their respective bishop's refusal to accept this administrative structure.

Notwithstanding all the trouble, the institute expanded. By 1877 it operated more than 40 schools in and around Adelaide, with many others in Queensland and New South Wales. With the help from Benson, Barr Smith, the Baker family, Emanuel Solomon, and other non-Catholics, the Josephites, with MacKillop as their superior general, were able to continue the religious and other good works, including visiting prisoners in jail.

1883: Sister Bernard becomes SG
Sydney's Archbishop Roger Vaughan died in 1883 and was succeeded by Patrick Francis Moran. Although he had a somewhat positive outlook toward the Josephites, he removed MacKillop as superior general and replaced her with Sister Bernard Walsh.

Pope Leo XIII made the Josephites into a religious congregation of Pontifical right in 1885, with its headquarters in Sydney. He gave the final approval to the Sisters of Saint Joseph of the Sacred Heart in 1888.

Although still living through alms, the Josephite sisters had been very successful. In South Australia they had schools in many country towns including, Willunga, Willochra, Yarcowie, Mintaro, Auburn, Jamestown, Laura, Sevenhill, Quorn, Spalding, Georgetown, Robe, Pekina, and Appila. MacKillop continued her work for the Josephites in Sydney and tried to provide as much support as possible for those in South Australia. In 1883 the institute was successfully established at Temuka in New Zealand, where MacKillop stayed for over a year. In 1889 it was also established in the Australian state of Victoria.

During all these years MacKillop assisted Mother Bernard with the management of the Sisters of St Joseph. She wrote letters of support, advice, and encouragement or just to keep in touch. By 1896, MacKillop was back in South Australia visiting fellow sisters in Port Augusta, Burra, Pekina, Kapunda, Jamestown, and Gladstone. That same year she travelled again to New Zealand, spending several months in Port Chalmers and Arrowtown in Otago. During her time in New Zealand the Sisters of St Joseph established a school in the South Island. In 1897, Bishop Maher of Port Augusta arranged for the Sisters of St Joseph to take charge of the St Anacletus Catholic Day School in Petersburg (now Peterborough).

MacKillop founded a convent and base for the Sisters of St Joseph in Petersborough on 16 January 1897. "On January 16th, 1897, the founder of the Sisters of St Joseph of the Sacred Heart, Mother Mary of the Cross, arrived in Peterborough to take over the school. She was accompanied by Sister Benizi (who was placed in charge of the school), Sister M. Joseph, Sister Clotilde, and Sister Aloysius Joseph. They were met at the station by Rev. Father Norton who took them to the newly blessed convent, purchased for them on Railway Terrace." The property at 40 Railway Terrace is identified as the convent by a plaque placed by the Diocese of Peterborough.

1889–1909: illness and death of Mary MacKillop
After the death of Mother Bernard, MacKillop was once more elected unopposed as superior general in 1899, a position she held until her own death. During the later years of her life she had many problems with her health which continued to deteriorate. She suffered from rheumatism and after a stroke in Auckland, New Zealand, in 1902, became paralysed on her right side. For seven years she had to rely on a wheelchair to move around, but her speech and mind were as good as ever and her letter writing had continued unabated after she learned to write with her left hand. Even after suffering the stroke, she inspired enough confidence among the Josephites that she was re-elected in 1905.

MacKillop died on 8 August 1909 in the Josephite convent in North Sydney. The Archbishop of Sydney, Cardinal Moran, stated that: "I consider this day to have assisted at the deathbed of a Saint." She was laid to rest at the Gore Hill Cemetery, a few kilometres up the Pacific Highway from North Sydney. After MacKillop's burial, people continually took earth from around her grave. As a result, her remains were exhumed and transferred on 27 January 1914 to a vault before the altar of the Virgin Mary in the newly built memorial chapel on Mount Street, Sydney. The vault was a gift of Joanna Barr Smith, a lifelong friend and admiring Presbyterian.

20th century

The wide network of schools and community aid organisations established by the sisters continued to expand throughout Australasia and elsewhere during the 20th century. While vocations within Australia suffered along with other religious institutes in the latter 20th century, its work continued and global recognition came with the canonisation of Mary MacKillop in 2010.

21st century
Since 1979 the Congregations of St Joseph, made up of all the Sisters of St Joseph and Associates throughout the world, have had a presence at the United Nations as a Non-Governmental Organisation (NGO). In 1999 the Congregations of St Joseph gained accreditation with the Economic and Social Council of the United Nations, allowing them access to other UN programs and agencies. As an NGO its focus is poverty, empowering women and children, ecology, environment, and immigrants.

The number of sisters teaching in schools and vocations in general have declined in Australia, however the congregation has incorporated works meeting the needs of today, including:

 Mary MacKillop Today –  life-changing projects in Australia and community development projects in Timor Leste, Peru, Papua New Guinea and Fiji. It includes a fair trade company, ethica in Australia.
 Good Grief – education programs and seminars for change, loss, and grief. Programs include Seasons for Growth, Stormbirds to assist children and young people after a natural disaster, and Seasons for Healing, a culturally appropriate program for Aboriginal and Torres Strait Islander adults.
 St Anthony's Family Care – caring for families and children
 MacKillop Community Rural Services – serving people in rural New South Wales

The work of the Sisters continues among the thousands of lay people who lead and serve in the ministries and direct the focus through being directors of the boards of the incorporated community works.  One organisation which has emerged among lay people is Josephite Community Aid. It was formed in 1986 to involve young lay people in community work with refugees and others, along with other volunteer programs. Mary MacKillop Centres were established as focal points for pilgrimage, learning, and spirituality.

By the end of the first decade of the 21st century, the Josephites reported around 850 sisters involved in ministering throughout Australia, New Zealand, Ireland, Peru, East Timor, Scotland, and Brazil. The sisters maintained an interest in working in education, aged care, ministry in rural areas, work with indigenous Australians, refugees, families, the homeless, and general pastoral and parish ministries. The South Australian Province Reconciliation Circle, comprising a group of Josephite and Carmelite women together with Aboriginal mentors, began meeting regularly in 2003 to work for justice and reconciliation in Indigenous affairs. In 2006 the Conference of Josephite Leaders (Central and Federation Congregations) established the Josephite Justice Office to conduct advocacy in the community.

Between 2012 and 2014 the Sisters of Saint Joseph of Tasmania, Goulburn, Whanganui (Sisters of St Joseph of Nazareth), and the Perthville Congregation have all merged as with the Sisters of St Joseph of the Sacred Heart.

Canonisation of Mary MacKillop

In 1925, the congregational leader of the Sisters of St Joseph, Mother Laurence, began the process to have MacKillop declared a saint and Archbishop Michael Kelly of Sydney established a tribunal to carry the process forward. After further investigations, MacKillop's "heroic virtue" was declared in 1992.  Her canonisation was announced on 19 February 2010 and took place on 17 October 2010. An estimated 8,000 Australians were present in Vatican City to witness the ceremony.

Notable members

Irene McCormack
Irene McCormack (21 August 1938 – 21 May 1991) was an Australian member of the Sisters of St Joseph of the Sacred Heart who worked as a missionary in Peru. She was executed there in 1991 by members of Sendero Luminoso ("Shining Path"), a Maoist rebel guerrilla organisation.

In October 2010, Australian media reported McCormack's possible recognised sainthood after Mary MacKillop's canonisation. The Daily Telegraph reported that senior Peruvian and Australian Catholic clergy planned on preparing a submission to the Vatican for McCormack's cause after Mary MacKillop's canonisation.

The Congregational Leader of the Sisters of St Joseph, Sister Ann Derwin, said that people in Huasahuasi, who already regarded McCormack as a saint, demanded this, since people judged to have been martyrs do not require evidence of miracles performed through their intercession.

Schools

Schools founded by the Josephites include:
St Joseph's School, Russell Street, in the south-western corner of Adelaide city centre, was founded when the sisters took over the school known as St Romuald's a year after its establishment in 1876. It closed in 1965 and the building (originally stables) was demolished in the late 1990s. Notable students included:
Dan Clifford (1887–1942), inaugural vice-president of the Old Scholars' Association in 1934, later owner of the Dan Clifford Cinema Circuit. 
 Albert Augustine Edwards (1888–1963), known as Bert, rumoured to be the illegitimate son of Charles Cameron Kingston, future Premier of South Australia, and later himself a politician in the South Australian Parliament.

Mary MacKillop College, a girls' secondary school in Kensington

References

Further reading

External links
 
 Mary MacKillop Place official website
 Mary MacKillop Penola Centre official website
 Mary McKillop Today

 
Catholic teaching orders
Religious organizations established in 1866
Catholic religious institutes established in the 19th century
Catholic female orders and societies
1866 establishments in Australia